WYDC (channel 48) is a television station licensed to Corning, New York, United States, serving as the Fox affiliate for the Elmira area. It is owned by Coastal Television Broadcasting Company LLC alongside low-power MyNetworkTV affiliate WJKP-LD (channel 39). Both stations share studios on East Market Street in Downtown Corning, while WYDC's transmitter is located on Higman Hill.

History
On June 9, 1988, the Federal Communications Commission (FCC) granted a construction permit to Rural New York Broadcasting, owned by Robert Walker of Albany, to build a new television station in Corning. In 1992, Walker moved to Florida and donated the permit to Cornerstone Television, a Christian broadcaster from Pittsburgh. Cornerstone never built the station, and instead it was Molly and David Grant, with investors known as Standfast Broadcasting, who put WYDC on the air in 1994 as independent "Big TV".

Big TV rapidly grew. It built translators in Elmira and Bath, became an affiliate of UPN and The WB in 1995, and added Fox in October 1996.

Vision Communications, headed by William Christian, leased the station with an option to buy in 1997 and moved to shift the station's focus to Fox, eliminating UPN programs. The new ownership upgraded the facilities with a $2 million investment. The Grants went on to start another station known as Big TV, UPN affiliate WBGT-LP in Rochester, which Vision acquired in 2002.

Vision Communications filed to sell its broadcast properties to Standard Media in 2019. The sale was never consummated.

Programming
Syndicated programming on this station includes Family Feud, Mike & Molly, 2 Broke Girls, and The People's Court among others. According to television listings, WYDC airs ten-minute update on weeknights known as Big Fox News at 10. All weather forecasts are provided through an outsourcing agreement by WeatherVision of Jackson, Mississippi. The prime time update competes with a weeknight thirty-minute newscast at 10 seen on WETM-DT2.

Technical information

Subchannels
The station's digital signal is multiplexed:

Analog-to-digital conversion
WYDC shut down its analog signal, over UHF channel 48, on June 12, 2009, the official date in which full-power television stations in the United States transitioned from analog to digital broadcasts under federal mandate. The station's digital signal relocated from its pre-transition UHF channel 50 to channel 48.

Translators
In addition to its main signal, WYDC can also be seen on five low-power digital repeaters. WYDC was also formerly repeated on WMYH-LP in Elmira/Watkins Glen, which is no longer licensed.

References

External links
Official website

Television channels and stations established in 1994
1994 establishments in New York (state)
YDC
Fox network affiliates
MeTV affiliates
Hornell, New York